Albert Yeo (6 November 1929 – 10 June 2014) was an Australian rules footballer who played for the Essendon Football Club in the Victorian Football League (VFL). Essendon cleared Yeo to fellow VFL side St Kilda midway through the 1958 season, but he did not play any senior games for them.

Originally from Barmera in the Riverland region, he previously played for Glenelg and West Adelaide in the South Australian National Football League. He was named in the Riverland Football League's Team of the Century in 2009.

Notes

External links 

Essendon Football Club past player profile

1929 births
2014 deaths
Australian rules footballers from South Australia
Essendon Football Club players
West Adelaide Football Club players
Glenelg Football Club players